Sitgreaves Pass is a gap at an elevation of 3,586 feet / 1,093 meters, in the Black Mountains of Mohave County, Arizona.
When Edward Fitzgerald Beale built Beale's Wagon Road over this pass, he named it John Howells Pass for one of the men in his expedition in October, 1857.  Subsequently, the pass was named for Captain Lorenzo Sitgreaves, of the Corps of Topographical Engineers, who led the 1851  Expedition Down the Zuni and Colorado Rivers.  Sitgreaves' expedition never crossed the Black Mountains by this pass, but did farther north, at Secret Pass or at Union Pass.  Under the mistaken impression Sitgreaves and his expedition had crossed this pass, the name was given to it by Lieutenant Joseph Christmas Ives of the Corps of Topographical Engineers in March 1858, as he passed eastward to survey the Colorado Plateau on his way to Fort Defiance, following his exploration of the Colorado River.

References

Mountain passes of Arizona
Landforms of Mohave County, Arizona